Brajići may refer to:
 Brajići, Foča, Bosnia and Herzegovina
 Brajići, Travnik, Bosnia and Herzegovina
 Brajići, Budva, Montenegro
 Brajići (Gornji Milanovac), Serbia